Joan Denise Lee (born 4 February 1952) was an English cricketer and former member of the England women's cricket team who played as a wicket-keeper. She played in one test match, against India in 1986. She played domestic cricket for Yorkshire.

References

External links
 
 

1952 births
Living people
England women Test cricketers
Yorkshire women cricketers